Pablo Chinchilla Vega (born December 21, 1978 in Escazú) is a Costa Rican footballer who currently is the player-manager of Austrian lower league side FC Koblach.

Career

Club
Chinchilla began his career in the youth system of Primera División de Costa Rica team Alajuelense. He was loaned to Austrian side Altach for a season before summoned back by Liga and he eventually graduated to their senior side making his professional debut for them on 15 August 1999 against Carmelita. He then scored his first goal on 12 September 1999 against San Carlos. After five years with the Rojinegros, during which time he won the 2004 CONCACAF Champions' Cup, he joined Los Angeles Galaxy of Major League Soccer prior to the 2005 season. His stay in the USA was largely unsuccessful and he returned to Alajuelense after just one season.

In summer 2006 Chinchilla rejoined Austrian club SC Rheindorf Altach, and spent two years playing with them in the Austrian Football Bundesliga. After a brief spell back home in Costa Rica at Liberia Mía Chinchilla returned to Austria by signing with LASK Linz in January 2009. He went amateur when he joined lower league side Lochau.

In summer 2013, Chinchilla left Lochau and moved to Austrian Landesklasse side Koblach to become player manager and extended his contract with a year in March 2014.

International
At junior level, Chinchilla played at the 1995 FIFA U-17 World Championship and the 1997 FIFA World Youth Championship.

He made his debut for Costa Rica in a November 1999 friendly match against Slovakia and earned a total of 39 caps, scoring 1 goal. He was a late addition to their 2002 World Cup squad, replacing the injured Reynaldo Parks and represented his country at the 2003 UNCAF Nations Cup as well as at the 2000 and 2003 CONCACAF Gold Cups. He was a non-playing squad member at the 2007 CONCACAF Gold Cup.

His final international was a February 2008 friendly game against Jamaica.

International goals
Scores and results list Costa Rica's goal tally first.

Honours
Alajuelense
 CONCACAF Champions' Cup: 2004

Los Angeles Galaxy
 Major League Soccer MLS Cup: 2005

References

External links
 
 Player bio – MLSnet
 Austrian Bundesliga stats - Bundesliga

1978 births
Living people
People from Escazú (canton)
Association football defenders
Costa Rican footballers
Costa Rica international footballers
2000 CONCACAF Gold Cup players
2001 UNCAF Nations Cup players
2002 FIFA World Cup players
2003 UNCAF Nations Cup players
2003 CONCACAF Gold Cup players
2007 CONCACAF Gold Cup players
L.D. Alajuelense footballers
LA Galaxy players
SC Rheindorf Altach players
Municipal Liberia footballers
LASK players
Liga FPD players
Costa Rican expatriate footballers
Expatriate soccer players in the United States
Expatriate footballers in Austria
Major League Soccer players
Austrian Football Bundesliga players
Copa Centroamericana-winning players
Central American Games gold medalists for Costa Rica
Central American Games medalists in football